The  1985–86 season was the 87th completed season of The Football League.

Final league tables and results 
The tables and results below are reproduced here in the exact form that they can be found at The Rec.Sport.Soccer Statistics Foundation website, with home and away statistics separated.

During the first five seasons of the league, that is, until the season 1893–94, re-election process concerned the clubs which finished in the bottom four of the league. From the 1894–95 season and until the 1920–21 season the re-election process was required of the clubs which finished in the bottom three of the league. From the 1922–23 season on it was required of the bottom two teams of both Third Division North and Third Division South. Since the Fourth Division was established in the 1958–59 season, the re-election process has concerned the bottom four clubs in that division.

First Division
In a close three-horse race, Liverpool pipped Everton and West Ham United to the First Division title, while also defeating Merseyside rivals Everton in the FA Cup Final, thereby completing a historic double. Manchester United had been ten points clear in early November after winning their first ten matches; and thirteen of their first fifteen, but injuries, loss of form and ineffective signings had seen them fall away, leaving them still waiting for their first league title since 1967, mounting the pressure of manager Ron Atkinson, although the Old Trafford board initially decided to stick with Atkinson as their manager for the following season.

Arsenal finished seventh in the league for a third successive season, their manager Don Howe resigning a few weeks before the end of the season after it was reported that Terry Venables had been offered his job. Coach Steve Burtenshaw was placed in temporary charge of the first team until the end of the season, when George Graham returned to Highbury as manager. Tottenham Hotspur finished a disappointing 10th in the league, prompting the White Hart Lane board to sack manager Peter Shreeves and replace him with Luton Town's David Pleat.

At the lower end of the table, a disastrous season saw West Bromwich Albion relegated in bottom place after just four wins in the league, while nearby rivals Birmingham City fared nearly as badly, and were relegated in second place from bottom; both clubs would not return to the top flight until 2002. Their local rivals Aston Villa nearly went down with them, before a late upturn in form secured their survival. Oxford United had a memorable first season at this level as League Cup winners, but spent much of the season battling against relegation before finally managing to beat the drop. The final relegation place went to Ipswich Town, who had gradually fallen out of contention with the First Division's leading pack since Bobby Robson's departure to manage the England team four years earlier.

Final table

First Division results

Managerial changes

First Division maps

Second Division

Second Division results

Second Division maps

Third Division

Third Division results

Third Division maps

Fourth Division

Fourth Division results

Fourth Division maps

Election/Re-election to the Football League
As champions of the Alliance Premier League, Enfield won the right to apply for election to the Football League, to replace one of the four bottom teams in the 1985–86 Football League Fourth Division. The vote went as follows:

Hence, all four Football League teams were re-elected, and Enfield were denied membership of the Football League.

This was the last season in which the Alliance Premier League champions had to apply for election to the Football League. From the 1986–87 season, when the Alliance Premier League was re-branded as the Football Conference, the champions were automatically promoted, provided that they met the criteria set by the Football League.

See also
1985–86 in English football

Notes

References

Ian Laschke: Rothmans Book of Football League Records 1888–89 to 1978–79. Macdonald and Jane's, London & Sydney, 1980.

External links
 1985–86 League Tables

 
English Football League seasons